Mícheál Ó Siochfhradha (1900–1986) and Pádraig (An Seabhac) Ó Siochfhradha were brothers who were writers, teachers and Irish language storytellers, from County Kerry, Ireland.

Mícheál Ó Siochfhradha wrote a number of comic short stories set in the Gaeltacht, notably, An Corp ('The Body'), which is part of the national curriculum's Irish course at Junior Certificate level. He trained as a teacher before becoming an inspector and retired as Chief Inspector in 1965. He was a founding member of An Comhar Drámaíochta Theatre Company, and edited two Irish dictionaries.

Books
 Michaél Ó Siochfhradha, "Naln agus gealn"
 Mícheál Ó Siochfhradha, "Learner's English-Irish dictionary"

1900 births
1986 deaths
20th-century Irish people
Irish educational theorists
Irish-language writers
People from County Kerry